Oleg Naumenko is a Ukrainian wheelchair fencer. He represented Ukraine at the 2016 Summer Paralympics and he won the bronze medal in the men's épée B event.

References

External links 
 

Living people
Year of birth missing (living people)
Place of birth missing (living people)
Ukrainian male épée fencers
Wheelchair fencers at the 2016 Summer Paralympics
Medalists at the 2016 Summer Paralympics
Paralympic bronze medalists for Ukraine
Paralympic medalists in wheelchair fencing
Paralympic wheelchair fencers of Ukraine
21st-century Ukrainian people